The University of California, Irvine School of Law (UCI Law) is the law school at the University of California, Irvine, a public research university in Irvine, California. Founded in 2007, it is the fifth and newest law school in the UC system. At the time of its founding, it was the first new public law school in California in over 40 years.

In September 2007, Erwin Chemerinsky was named as the law school's first dean. Chemerinsky was hired to be dean of the UC Berkeley School of Law in 2017; L. Song Richardson became interim dean in July 2017 and full dean in January 2018. Song Richardson served as the dean until 2021 when she was hired as President of Colorado College. Bryant Garth became interim dean in July 2021. Austen Parrish was named as the law school's third dean in April 2022.

History
Initially, it was announced that the school would be named for Donald Bren, chairman of the Irvine Company, due to his $20 million donation towards its founding. In 2008, an agreement was reached between Bren and UCI that the school would not bear his name, in order to be consistent with other UC schools and the trend away from naming law schools after major donors.

In the summer of 2011, the American Bar Association granted the school provisional accreditation. As law schools need to exist for two years before being granted provisional accreditation, this was the earliest point at which the school could become accredited. The school was granted full accreditation in June 2014.

Chemerinsky hiring controversy
In hiring an inaugural dean, the University approached  Duke University school of law Professor Erwin Chemerinsky.  After signing a contract with Chemerinsky on September 4, 2007, the offer was rescinded by then UCI Chancellor Michael V. Drake because he felt the law professor's commentaries were "polarizing" and would not serve the interests of California's first new public law school in 40 years; Drake claimed the decision was his own and not the subject of any outside influence.  The action was criticized by liberal and conservative scholars who felt it hindered the academic mission of the law school, and disbelief over Chancellor Drake's claims that it was the subject of no outside influence.

The issue was the subject of a New York Times editorial on Friday, September 14, 2007.  Details emerged revealing that UCI had received criticism on the hire from California Chief Justice Ronald M. George, who criticized Chemerinsky's grasp of death penalty appeals, as well as a group of prominent Orange County Republicans and Los Angeles County Supervisor Michael D. Antonovich, who wanted to derail the appointment.  Drake traveled over a weekend to Durham, North Carolina, and the two reached an agreement late Sunday evening.  On September 17, Chemerinsky issued a joint press release with Drake indicating that Chemerinsky would head the UCI law school, stating "Our new law school will be founded on the bedrock principle of academic freedom. The chancellor reiterated his lifelong, unqualified commitment to academic freedom, which extends to every faculty member, including deans and other senior administrators."

Faculty
In 2010, University of Chicago Law professor Brian Leiter, in his "Leiter Law School Rankings", ranked the UC Irvine faculty 9th in the nation in terms of scholarly impact. In 2012, Professor Gregory Sisk and his colleagues in the library of St. Thomas Law School in Minnesota prepared a new scholarly impact study, using the same methodology as Leiter's 2010 study and with Leiter consulting. The 2012 study calculated scholarly impact in terms of citations by full-time teaching faculty over the period from 2007 through 2011, and ranked the UC Irvine Law School faculty as 7th, up two places from the 2010 ranking.

In September 2015, Sisk updated the rankings to include data from 2010-2014. Based on this new data, UC Irvine was ranked 6th in the nation.

UC Irvine's student-faculty ratio is 7.3 to 1, making it one of the lowest ratios among law schools in the country.

Rankings and scholarships
To help attract "high-quality" students, the school raised funds for full scholarships for all members of its inaugural class. Over 2,700 applications were received to join the inaugural class, 4% were accepted. Classes officially began on August 24, 2009. The school's inaugural class was composed of 34 women and 26 men, with a median LSAT of 167 and median undergraduate GPA of 3.61.

UC Irvine's initial LSAT and GPA statistics rival Southern California's other top law schools, UCLA and USC, which are both ranked among the nation's top 20 by U.S. News & World Report.

Despite offering reduced scholarships to its next two classes (one-half for 2013, and one-third for 2014) and application pools dropping to less than one thousand per year, GPA and LSAT numbers for these classes remained largely the same.  The school announced that while need-based financial aid would be available to the Class of 2015, a universal scholarship for every student would not be offered. However, the school set aside funds for 20 full scholarships for this class including some scholarships specifically for students who wish to pursue public interest law.

UCI Law School received its first U.S. News & World Report ranking in March 2015, when it was ranked #30 in the nation.  By then, the median LSAT was 164 and the median undergraduate GPA was 3.53. The publication also ranked UC Irvine 11th for its clinical program, 23rd for its intellectual property law program, and in the top 10 for the student diversity index.

In March 2016, U.S. News & World Reportranked UC Irvine 28th among 144 law schools, up two places from the previous year. It was also ranked #13 in clinical training,   #23 in legal writing, #25 in intellectual property, and in the top 12 for the student diversity index.

In 2016, The National Jurist ranked UC Irvine #4 in its "Best Schools for Practical Training" rankings.

In March 2018, U.S. News & World Reportranked UC Irvine 21st among 146 law schools, up seven places from the previous year. By 2022, the school’s  ranking had dropped to 35th. 

Federal clerkships

In December 2011, the percentage of the Class of 2012 students who had received Federal District Court or Circuit Court judge clerkships for the year following graduation was near the highest in the country, placing only lower than Yale, and placing ahead of Harvard Law.

In May 2015, the ABA released the newest edition of law school employment data. Based on these new findings, UCI was ranked third in the placement of federal clerkships, behind only Yale and Stanford.

Employment
According to UC Irvine's official 2015 ABA-required disclosures, 85.45% of the Class of 2015 obtained full-time, long-term, JD-required employment nine months after graduation. UC Irvine's Law School Transparency under-employment score is 11.82%, indicating the percentage of the Class of 2015 unemployed, pursuing an additional degree, or working in a non-professional, short-term, or part-time job nine months after graduation.

Tuition
Tuition for 2011-12 cost approximately $40,000 for California residents and $52,000 for non-residents. For the first, second, and third entering classes, tuition was paid for by private scholarships from Mark P. Robinson Jr., and others at 100%, 50%, and 33% respectively. During the 2019-2020 academic year, 39.1% of students received a scholarship covering more than 50% of the cost of tuition, 55.1% of students received a scholarship covering less than 50% of the cost of tuition, and 2.1% of students received no scholarship. 

The total cost of tuition (not including the cost of living) at the University of California-Irvine School of Law for the 2021-2022 academic year is $51,888.30 for California residents and $60,131.30 for non-residents. The Law School Transparency estimates the cost of living in Irvine, California is $32,650 per year.

References

External links

Law School
California, Irvine
Educational institutions established in 2008
2008 establishments in California